I Origins is a 2014 American science fiction romantic drama film written and directed by Mike Cahill. It won the Best Feature Length Film Award at the Festival Internacional de Cinema Fantàstic de Catalunya on October 11, 2014.

Plot
A Ph.D. student, Ian Gray, is researching the evolution of the eye with research partner, Kenny, and first-year lab assistant, Karen. At a Halloween party Gray encounters Sofi, a young woman masked with only hazel-speckled, ash-blue eyes visible. She later leads him into the washroom to have sex before abruptly leaving.

Mysterious synchronicities, like the recurring number 11,  guide Gray to a billboard on which he recognizes Sofi's eyes. Eventually he sees her on a train. They begin a relationship although his rationalism clashes with her fey spirituality. One day they spontaneously agree to marry but must wait a day for a license. Disappointed, they walk out of the registry office. Ian gets a call from Karen. She has found a blind worm—Eisenia fetida—with the DNA necessary to develop an eye. Ian takes Sofi to the lab with him.

Karen leaves while Sofi is upset by the research they are doing. Ian accidentally splashes his eyes with formaldehyde. They call Karen, who administers first aid. Sofi takes Ian home. On the way up, Sofi's lower half is chopped off in an elevator accident.

The film flashes forward seven years. Ian has written an eye evolution book and is now married to pregnant Karen. When their baby is born, the hospital takes an iris scan of baby Tobias' eyes. The results are entered in the database and the program identifies the baby as a certain Paul Edgar Dairy. The nurse re-enters the results, thinking it is a glitch, and the problem disappears. A few months later, a Dr. Simmons calls, recommending further testing the baby. The test involves seemingly random photographs. Ian and Karen become suspicious. He tracks some pictures from the test to Idaho and the family of Paul Edgar Dairy, who had died just before their baby was conceived.

Kenny is now creator of the iris scan database used to store Tobias' scan, and Kenny reveals that Dr. Simmons is in fact one of only five people with full access to the database. As a test, he helps Ian and Karen run some photos of deceased family members, plus various other people's eyes through the database to see if there are any other recent matches. They get a hit for Sofi, whose iris scan matches one made in India just three months prior, years after Sofi's death.

Ian goes to India to find the subject of this scan, an orphan girl named Salomina. With help from Priya Varma, he spends weeks searching and putting up billboards. Eventually he finds the little girl staring at the billboard. He takes Salomina back to his hotel and contacts Karen over Skype. The two of them conduct a simple test designed to reveal if Salomina might be somehow linked with Sofi's memories. The results match the probable range of random chance, with a 44% success score. Feeling somewhat disheartened,  Ian intends to take Salomina to Priya. But when they reach the elevator, the moment the doors open Salomina panics and throws herself into his arms, too frightened to enter. Staring into each other's eyes with a certain recognition, they then cling to each other, tears streaming down both their faces. He picks her up and takes her down the stairs instead, with Salomina tightly gripping his neck, till they walk from the dark interior and step out into the light.

A post-credits scene shows Dr. Simmons scanning the irises of famous deceased figures finding many such matches.

Cast
 Michael Pitt as Ian Gray
 Brit Marling as Karen
 Àstrid Bergès-Frisbey as Sofi Elizondo
 Steven Yeun as Kenny
 Archie Panjabi as Priya Varma
 Cara Seymour as Dr. Jane Simmons
 Venida Evans as Margaret Dairy
 William Mapother as Darryl Mackenzie
 Kashish Kumari  as Salomina
Ako as Nurse

Production 
I Origins was the second feature film by writer-director Mike Cahill after his earlier independent science fiction-drama, Another Earth (2011), also with actress Brit Marling. Cahill sold the film rights to Another Earth to Fox Searchlight Pictures at the 2011 Sundance Film Festival. At that time he also sold a screenplay to what would be his next feature film titled I. Though during the development of I, after failing to "crack" some aspects of the story, Cahill instead decided to make an origin story for the film, in which he had a "rich back story for".

Although Fox Searchlight owned the rights to any prequels or sequels to the I script, Cahill decided to make I Origins  independently. He intended to sell the film at the Sundance Film Festival, like he did for Another Earth. Fox Searchlight agreed and the film was produced by Verisimilitude and WeWork Studios in association with Bersin Pictures and Penny Jane Films. After the premiere of I Origins at the 2014 Sundance Film Festival, Fox Searchlight ended up buying the rights to the film.

Release
After its premiere, Fox Searchlight Pictures bought rights to worldwide distribution of the film. The film won the festival's Alfred P. Sloan Prize, which recognizes films that depict science and technology. The win was Cahill's second; his film Another Earth also won the prize in 2011. I Origins also screened at the Brooklyn-based BAMcinemaFest and at the Nantucket Film Festival, both in late June 2014.

The following week, it expanded to 76 theaters.

Reception
I Origins received mixed reviews from critics. Rotten Tomatoes gave the film a rating of 53%, based on 100 reviews, with a weighted average score of 6/10. The site's consensus states: "Writer-director Mike Cahill remains an intriguingly ambitious talent, but with the uneven sci-fi drama I Origins, his reach exceeds his grasp". On Metacritic, the film has a score of 57 out of 100, based on 36 critics, indicating "mixed or average reviews". Jordan Zakarin, of entertainment and media news website TheWrap, said that "The movie starts as a love story and then morphs into a thriller, propelled always by the push and pull of faith and logic, with tragedy shifting world views over time". He continued, saying that "The message is both micro and macro, aimed at the renewed war in the United States over issues like science education and contraception, as well as Cahill's way of working out his own mixed emotions".

Sequel
I Origins was developed as a prequel to I, a screenplay which Cahill sold to Fox Searchlight Pictures in 2011. Cahill intended for I to take place twenty years after the event of I Origins, after the repercussions of Dr. Ian Gray’s discoveries take hold, as teased in the post-credits of the film.

During press interviews for the film, Cahill spoke of plans to go ahead with a sequel to I Origins, saying "There's a sequel in the works. It's not scripted. We're not in production yet, but we set up at Fox Searchlight".

See also
 Afghan Girl
 Iris recognition
 Irreducible complexity

References

External links

 
 
 
 
 

2014 films
2014 independent films
2010s science fiction drama films
American science fiction drama films
Alfred P. Sloan Prize winners
American independent films
Sundance Film Festival award winners
Films set in 2006
Films set in 2013
Films set in 2014
Films set in Delhi
Films set in Connecticut
Films set in Idaho
Films set in New York City
Films about reincarnation
Fox Searchlight Pictures films
Films directed by Mike Cahill
2014 drama films
2010s English-language films
2010s American films